The following is a list of characters from the wuxia novel The Smiling, Proud Wanderer by Jin Yong.

Five Mountain Sword Schools Alliance

Mount Hua School

 Linghu Chong is the happy-go-lucky protagonist of the novel. An orphan, he was raised and trained by Yue Buqun and Ning Zhongze as their first apprentice. He learns the Nine Swords of Dugu from Feng Qingyang and becomes a formidable swordsman. His sudden leap in swordplay prowess causes his master to suspect him of having stolen the Bixie Swordplay Manual and mastered the skill. Even after his expulsion from Mount Hua, he remains loyal and respectful towards his former master. However, they ultimately become enemies after Yue Buqun is revealed to be a power-hungry hypocrite. Linghu Chong eventually retires from the jianghu to lead a peaceful life with Ren Yingying.
 Yue Su and Cai Zifeng were two Mount Hua School swordsmen who became rivals and respectively founded the Qi and Sword factions. See also their connections to the Sunflower Manual.

Qi faction
 Yue Buqun is the leader of the Mount Hua School. Although he is nicknamed "Gentleman Sword" for his gentlemanly conduct, he gradually reveals his true personality – a bigoted, narcissistic and power-hungry hypocrite. He lusts for the Lin family's Bixie Swordplay Manual and plots an elaborate scheme to seize it, after which he castrates himself to fulfil the prerequisite for learning the swordplay. He is also secretly jealous of Linghu Chong for his sudden leap in swordplay prowess, refusing to accept the fact that his apprentice has surpassed him. He is incidentally killed by Yilin during the final battle with Linghu Chong while attempting to trap and kill his rivals inside a cave on Mount Hua.
 Ning Zhongze, nicknamed "Heroine Ning", is Yue Buqun's chivalrous and kindly wife. She regards Linghu Chong as a son and is also the only person who believes his innocence in the theft of the Bixie Swordplay Manual. She loses her will to live after seeing her husband reveal his true colours and learning of her daughter's death, and eventually commits suicide out of shame at her husband's actions.
 Yue Lingshan is Yue Buqun and Ning Zhongze's daughter and Linghu Chong's first romantic interest. She falls in love with Lin Pingzhi later and marries him. However, she eventually learns that she is actually a pawn in a struggle for power between her husband and her father. Lin Pingzhi kills her after she refuses to follow him to join Zuo Lengchan in taking revenge against Yue Buqun. Before dying, she makes Linghu Chong promise to spare her husband's life.   
 Lin Pingzhi is Lin Zhennan's son and the sole survivor of the Lin family, who was massacred by the Qingcheng School. Yue Buqun saves him, takes him in as an apprentice, and arranges for a marriage between him and Yue Lingshan. Driven by hatred and resentment after discovering Yue Buqun's ulterior motives, he becomes increasingly vicious and brutally kills his family's murderers in revenge, but is blinded by Mu Gaofeng. He is eventually defeated and permanently disabled by Linghu Chong, who imprisons him in an underground dungeon so that he can neither harm others nor be harmed by others.
 Lao Denuo, nicknamed "Old Man Sa", is Yue Buqun's second apprentice who is actually a spy sent by Zuo Lengchan to steal the Violet Mist Divine Skill manual from Yue Buqun. He murders Lu Dayou and attempts to push the blame to Linghu Chong. After Zuo Lengchan's death, he attempts to learn the Bixie Swordplay on his own but fails and ends up losing all his inner energy. During Linghu Chong and Ren Yingying's wedding, Ren Yingying reveals that the Sun Moon Holy Cult has captured and forced Lao Denuo to live among monkeys.
 Liang Fa is Yue Buqun's third apprentice. He is killed by Mount Song School members.
 Shi Daizi is Yue Buqun's fourth apprentice.
 Gao Genming is Yue Buqun's fifth apprentice.
 Lu Dayou is Yue Buqun's sixth apprentice who is nicknamed "Sixth Monkey" for his monkey-like behaviour and affinity with primates. A close friend of Linghu Chong, he is murdered by Lao Denuo, who attempts to push the blame to Linghu Chong.
 Tao Jun is Yue Buqun's seventh apprentice.
 Ying Bailuo is Yue Buqun's eighth apprentice. After he witnesses his master trying to harm Lin Pingzhi, his master kills him outside the Lin family residence in Fuzhou.
 Shu Qi is the youngest among Yue Buqun's apprentices.

Sword faction
 Feng Qingyang is an elderly swordsman from the Sword faction. During the school's internal conflict, he was lured away by the Qi faction, who used the opportunity to defeat and force the Sword faction into exile. Feeling disgraced for being deceived, he leaves the school and leads a reclusive life in a secluded area on Mount Hua. He meets Linghu Chong by chance and teaches him the Nine Swords of Dugu as he is very impressed with Linghu Chong's good character and intelligence. His name is derived from a poem in the Classic of Poetry.
 Feng Buping is the leader-in-exile of the Sword faction. Zuo Lengchan instigates him to return to Mount Hua to challenge Yue Buqun for the position of leadership of their school. He is defeated by Linghu Chong and forced back into exile.
 Cheng Buyou is Feng Buping's junior. He is torn into four pieces by the "Six Immortals of the Peach Valley".
 Cong Buqi is Feng Buping's junior. He is defeated by Linghu Chong.

Mount Song School
 Zuo Lengchan is the ambitious and ruthless leader of the Mount Song School and chief of the Five Mountain Sword Schools Alliance. He practises a skill, Freezing Inner Energy, which allows him to freeze his inner energy to sub-zero temperature and increase its power tremendously. He had sent Lao Denuo to infiltrate the Mount Hua School and steal the Bixie Swordplay Manual from Yue Buqun; Lao Denuo steals a fake copy of the manual for him and he practises the swordplay without knowing it is not the real one. After that, he calls for a special assembly of the alliance on Mount Song and attempts to intimidate the other four schools into submitting to him. However, he is defeated and blinded by Yue Buqun, who uses the real Bixie Swordplay against him. After his defeat, he pretends to concede his position as the alliance chief to Yue Buqun. Later, he leads his followers to Mount Hua to kill Yue Buqun, who sees through his plan and traps them inside a cave. The trapped swordsmen start killing each other out of paranoia and mistrust; Zuo Lengchan is killed by Linghu Chong during the frenzy.
 Zuo Lengchan's juniors:
 Ding Mian, nicknamed "Pagoda-Bearing Hand".
 Lu Bai, nicknamed "Heavenly Crane Hand".
 Fei Bin, nicknamed "Great Songyang Hand", is killed by Mo Da.
 Deng Bagong, nicknamed "Divine Whip".
 Gao Kexin, nicknamed "Colourful Lion".
 Tang Ying'e, nicknamed "Red and White Sword".
 Zhong Zhen, nicknamed "Nine Sections Sword".
 Yue Hou, nicknamed "Great Yinyang Hand", is one of the martial artists who attacks Xiang Wentian. Linghu Chong comes to Xiang Wentian's aid and injures Yue Hou.
 Bu Chen, nicknamed "White Haired Old Immortal", is killed by Linghu Chong in Fuzhou while attempting to steal the Bixie Swordplay Manual.
 Sha Tianjiang, nicknamed "Bald Eagle", is killed by Linghu Chong in Fuzhou.
 Shi Dengda, nicknamed "Thousand Zhàng Pine", is killed by Zuo Lengchan during the special assembly on Mount Song.
 Wan Daping is Shi Dengda's junior.
 Di Xiu is one of Zuo Lengchan's apprentices. He is killed by his master during the special assembly on Mount Song.

(North) Mount Heng School
 The "Three Elder Nuns" are the leaders of the Mount Heng School.
 Dingjing is the most senior of the trio, but she willingly gives up the position of leadership to her junior, Dingxian. Zuo Lengchan sends his henchmen to ambush her and force her to let the (North) Mount Heng School be absorbed into the Mount Song School. She refuses to capitulate and dies from her wounds before Linghu Chong can save her.
 Dingxian is the benevolent and wise leader of the school. She is mortally wounded by a masked Yue Buqun in Shaolin Monastery. Before dying, she passes on her leadership position to Linghu Chong.
 Dingyi is the most junior of the trio and the most hot-tempered one. She and Dingxian are murdered by a masked Yue Buqun in Shaolin Monastery.
 Yilin is Dingyi's apprentice and the daughter of Monk Bujie and Mute Granny. She falls in love with Linghu Chong after he rescues her from Tian Boguang's sexual advances, but has to suppress her feelings because she is forbidden by her vow of celibacy. Her mother tries to force her to marry Linghu Chong but she refuses.
 Tian Boguang is a bandit nicknamed "Lone Traveller of Ten Thousand Li". Notorious for his lecherous behaviour and for raping many women, he makes sexual advances on Yilin but is stopped by Linghu Chong. Having lost a bet to Linghu Chong, he has to uphold a promise to leave Yilin alone from then on. Later in the novel, Monk Bujie semi-castrates Tian Boguang and forces him to become a Buddhist monk, renaming him to Buke Bujie, which means "cannot have no rules". He ultimately joins the Mount Heng School.
 Bujie is a Buddhist monk and Yilin's father. He fell in love with Mute Granny and renamed himself "Bujie", which means "no rules". He attempts to cure Linghu Chong of his internal wounds by injecting two streams of inner energy into his body to suppress the six streams of energies, saving Linghu's life momentarily.
 Mute Granny was a Buddhist nun who fell in love with Bujie and bore him their daughter, Yilin. She has remained close to her daughter all this time by pretending to be a mute caretaker working for the (North) Mount Heng School.
 Yihe is the most senior of the school's members of the Yi generation.
 Yiqing is Yihe's junior who succeeds Linghu Chong as the school's leader.
 Yizhi is Dingjing's apprentice.
 Yizhen is Dingjing's apprentice. She delivers medicine to Yue Lingshan in Fuzhou.
 Yiling accompanies Yizhen to deliver medicine to Yue Lingshan.
 Yiguang is Yilin's senior.
 Yiwen is Dingxian's apprentice.
 Qin Juan is a secular apprentice of Dingjing.
 Zheng E is a secular member of the Mount Heng School.
 Aunt Yu is originally Dingxian's servant. Dingxian accepts her as an apprentice later.

(South) Mount Heng School
 Mo Da is the mysterious leader of the Mount Heng School who is known for playing melancholic tunes on a huqin, where his sword is concealed. His swordplay techniques, which correspond with musical themes, are very fast and unpredictable. Although he is part of the alliance, he disapproves of the Mount Song School's overreaching actions and, at one point, disobeys their order to kill Liu Zhengfeng and Qu Yang. He sees that Linghu Chong is a decent man and helps him out. At the end of the novel, he is the sole surviving member from his school.
 Xiang Danian is Liu Zhengfeng's first apprentice. He is killed by Ding Mian.
 Mi Weiyi is Liu Zhengfeng's second apprentice.
 Fang Qianju
 Lu Lianrong

Liu family
 Liu Zhengfeng, nicknamed "Third Master Liu", is Mo Da's junior. He plays the dizi and befriends Qu Yang of the Sun Moon Holy Cult, who shares the same passion for music with him. The duo compose the musical piece "Xiaoao Jianghu" together. He intends to leave the jianghu and invites fellow martial artists to witness his retirement ceremony. During the event he is confronted by Zuo Lengchan and his followers and comes under attack. While fleeing together with Qu Yang, he meets Linghu Chong and passes him the music score for "Xiaoao Jianghu". He and Qu Yang then commit suicide by bursting their arteries with their inner energy.
 Mrs Liu is Liu Zhengfeng's wife who is killed by Di Xiu.
 Young Master Liu is Liu Zhengfeng's elder son who is killed by Di Xiu.
 Liu Jing is Liu Zhengfeng's daughter who is killed by Wan Daping.
 Liu Qin is Liu Zhengfeng's younger son.

Mount Tai School
 Tianmen is the leader of the Mount Tai School. He is betrayed and overthrown by Yujizi and others, who have been bribed by Zuo Lengchan, during the special assembly on Mount Song. He then fights with Qinghai Yixiao and perishes together with him.
 Yujizi is a junior of Tianmen's master. He has been bribed by Zuo Lengchan to seize his school's leadership position from Tianmen during the special assembly. He debates with the Six Immortals of the Peach Valley on who should be the rightful leader of the alliance, and attempts to fight them but ends up having his limbs torn from his body.
 Yuqingzi and Yuyinzi are the juniors of Tianmen's master. They are killed in the cave on Mount Hua.
 Yuzhongzi is killed by Zuo Lengchan in the cave on Mount Hua.
 Tiansong is Tianmen's junior who is injured by Tian Boguang.
 Tianyi is among the group of martial artists who attacked Xiang Wentian. Linghu Chong comes to Xiang Wentian's aid and knocks Tianyi unconscious.
 Chi Baicheng is one of Tianmen's apprentices who is killed by Tian Boguang.
 Jianchu is Tianmen's second apprentice.

Sun Moon Holy Cult
 Ren Woxing is the highly feared leader of the Sun Moon Holy Cult and an expert in martial arts, politics, and manipulation. He mastered the Cosmic Absorbing Power, a dreaded ability which allows the practitioner to drain and absorb an opponent's inner energy. After Dongfang Bubai ousted him from power, he was imprisoned in an underground dungeon in Hangzhou for 12 years. He escapes from the dungeon with help from Linghu Chong, and then returns to confront Dongfang Bubai and seize his leadership position back. Towards the end of the novel, he dies of natural causes from a stroke while planning a grand strategy to destroy all the orthodox schools in the jianghu.
 Ren Yingying is Ren Woxing's daughter. Although she is intelligent and caring towards her subordinates, she can be ruthless and cold-blooded at times. She meets Linghu Chong in Luoyang while in disguise as a guqin-playing old woman, and falls in love with him after being attracted by his chivalrous personality. She succeeds her father as the cult's leader after his death, but eventually retires to lead a reclusive life with Linghu Chong.
 Dongfang Bubai became the cult's leader after overthrowing Ren Woxing. He castrated himself in order to fulfil the prerequisite for learning the skills in the Sunflower Manual and became the most powerful martial artist in the jianghu of his time. He developed an intimate relationship with Yang Lianting, whom he delegated his job to, and spent his time on embroidery. He is eventually defeated and killed by the combined efforts of Ren Woxing, Xiang Wentian, and Linghu Chong.
 Xiang Wentian is an elder of the cult. After Dongfang Bubai overthrew Ren Woxing, he refused to renounce his loyalty to the former leader and became an outcast of the cult. Linghu Chong chances upon him while he is under attack by a group of "orthodox" martial artists, and helps him fend off the attackers. He feels grateful to Linghu Chong and decides to become sworn brothers with him after realising that both of them have had similar experiences. He later succeeds Ren Yingying as the cult's leader after she improves the cult's relations with other schools.
 Lan Fenghuang is the Miao leader of the Five Immortals Cult and a close friend of Ren Yingying. She attempts to cure Linghu Chong of his internal injuries, but fails. She becomes Linghu Chong's godsister later. She is skilled in using poisons and can summon various venomous creatures to her aid in combat.
 Lüzhuweng is Ren Yingying's subordinate. He disguises himself as an old man who makes bamboo baskets in Luoyang. He is very skilled in playing the guqin.
 Bao Dachu, Qin Weibang, Wang Cheng and Sang Sanniang are among the cult's elders who defected to Dongfang Bubai's side when Ren Woxing was overthrown. Ren Woxing returns to confront them later after he escapes from the dungeon in Hangzhou.
 Jia Bu, nicknamed "Yellow Faced Honourable", is a minor leader in the cult. Dongfang Bubai orders him to lead his subordinates to (North) Mount Heng to capture Linghu Chong. He is killed by Fangzheng.
 Shangguan Yun, nicknamed "Eagle Hero", is another minor leader in the cult. He accompanies Jia Bu to (North) Mount Heng to capture Linghu Chong. He surrenders to Ren Woxing later.
 Yang Lianting is Dongfang Bubai's lover. He becomes the cult's de facto leader when Dongfang Bubai delegated the task of overseeing the cult to him. He is killed by Ren Yingying.
 Tong Baixiong is a minor leader in the cult and a close associate of Dongfang Bubai. He is pierced to death by Dongfang Bubai's needles.

Ten Elders
Several years ago, ten senior elders of the cult attacked the Five Mountain Sword Schools on Mount Hua but were lured into a trap and ended up being trapped inside a cave, where they eventually died. Before they died, the elders figured out new techniques to counter the swordplay movements of the five schools and carved them on the cave walls. Several years later, Linghu Chong entered the cave by chance and discovered their remains and the carvings. Some of the elders were:
 Zhang Chengyun, nicknamed "White Ape Devil", specialised in using pole weapons.
 Zhang Chengfeng, nicknamed "Golden Monkey Devil", was Zhang Chengyun's brother. He also specialised in using pole weapons.
 Fan Song, nicknamed "Great Strength Devil", specialised in using axes.
 Zhao He, nicknamed "Sky Soaring Devil", specialised in using clubs.

Qu family
 Qu Yang is an elder of the cult who plays the guqin. He befriends Liu Zhengfeng, who shares the same passion for music as him, and composes the musical piece "Xiaoao Jianghu" with him. He commits suicide together with Liu Zhengfeng when both of them are cornered by Zuo Lengchan's followers. Before dying, the two of them pass the score of "Xiaoao Jianghu" to Linghu Chong.
 Qu Feiyan is Qu Yang's granddaughter. She is killed by Fei Bin.

Shaolin School

 Fangzheng is the abbot of Shaolin Monastery who is highly revered in the jianghu for his prowess in martial arts and morally upright character. He is well-aware of the power struggles in the jianghu and is one of the few who see through Yue Buqun's hypocrisy. When he meets Linghu Chong for the first time, he believes it is fated for Linghu to learn the Yijin Jing so he requests that Linghu join the Shaolin School. Fangzheng proves to be at least Ren Woxing's equal when they fight with each other for the first time.
 Fangsheng is Fangzheng's junior.
 Xin Guoliang, Yi Guozi, Huang Guobai, and Jueyue are killed by Ren Yingying.

Wudang School

 Chongxu is the leader of the Wudang School. Like Fangzheng of the Shaolin School, he is highly respected in the jianghu for his prowess in martial arts and morally upright character. While travelling in disguise as a farmer, he meets Linghu Chong, engages him in a friendly duel, and feels impressed when Linghu Chong uses the Nine Swords of Dugu to defeat his Taiji Swordplay. Towards the end of the novel, he and Fangzheng suggest that Linghu Chong fight for the position of chief of the Five Mountain Sword Schools Alliance since they think that he is less ambitious compared to Zuo Lengchan and will not pose a threat to Wudang and Shaolin.
 Qingxu is Chongxu's junior who disguises himself as a woodcutter while accompanying his senior in his travels.
 Chenggao is an apprentice of Chongxu's junior. He follows Chongxu around in disguise as a vegetable seller.

Qingcheng School
 Yu Canghai is the leader of the Qingcheng School. After Lin Pingzhi accidentally killed his son in a brawl, he led the Qingcheng School to massacre the Lin family and destroy the Fuwei Security Service in the name of avenging his son while actually using the opportunity to search for the Lin family's Bixie Swordplay manual. He does not find it. Lin Pingzhi survives the massacre, joins the Mount Hua School, and returns to take his revenge on Yu Canghai and his followers in the later chapters. Yu Canghai is known for his Pine Wind Swordplay, which allows him to enshroud his foes in a green hue.
 Yu Renyan is Yu Canghai's son. He is killed by Lin Pingzhi.
 The "Four Gentlemen of Qingcheng" are Yu Canghai's four most senior apprentices. Three of them, Hou Renying, Hong Renxiong, and Yu Renhao are killed by Lin Pingzhi. The fourth, Luo Renjie, is killed by Linghu Chong in an early chapter.
 Jia Renda is trampled to death by Lin Pingzhi's horse.
 Fang Renzhi is stabbed to death by Lin Pingzhi.
 Li Rencai
 Peng Renqi is killed by Tian Boguang.
 Ji Rentong is killed by Lin Pingzhi.
 Shen Renjun

Fuwei Security Service
 Lin Yuantu was the founder of the Fuwei Security Service. Previously a Shaolin monk known as Duyuan, he returned to secular life and created the Bixie Swordplay based on Yue Su and Cai Zifeng's recollections of the Sunflower Manual. Although his use of the Bixie Swordplay brought him fame and glory, it also became a curse to his descendants because it made them the target of many martial artists seeking to seize possession of the Bixie Swordplay Manual and master the skill. He hid the manual in the Lin family residence in Fuzhou and passed down a family rule forbidding his descendants from seeking the manual and learning the swordplay.
 Lin Zhennan is a descendant of Lin Yuantu and Lin Pingzhi's father. He is the current leader of the agency. After his son, Lin Pingzhi, accidentally kills Yu Canghai's son in a brawl, Yu leads his Qingcheng School followers to attack the Lin family and destroy the agency. Lin Zhennan and his wife are captured by Yu Canghai, who resorts to various means to force them to reveal the whereabouts of the Bixie Swordplay Manual, but they insist that they do not know. The couple are later captured by Mu Gaofeng, who tortures them to death.
 Madam Wang is Lin Zhennan's wife and Lin Pingzhi's mother. She is the daughter of Wang Yuanba.

Golden Saber School
 Wang Yuanba, nicknamed "Invincible Golden Saber", is the leader of the Golden Saber School in Luoyang and Lin Pingzhi's maternal grandfather. Like many others in the jianghu, he secretly covets the Bixie Swordplay manual and mistakenly thinks that the musical score of "Xiaoao Jianghu", which is in Linghu Chong's possession, is the manual.
 Wang Bofen is Wang Yuanba's eldest son.
 Wang Zhongqiang is Wang Yuanba's second son.
 Wang Jiajun is Wang Zhongqiang's eldest son.
 Wang Jiaju is Wang Zhongqiang's youngest son.
 Adviser Yi is the Wang family's household accountant and an amateur musician. He suggests to his master to bring the score of "Xiaoao Jianghu" to Lüzhuweng to verify that it is indeed a musical score and not a swordplay manual.

Four Friends of Jiangnan
The "Four Friends of Jiangnan" are a group of four eccentric martial artists tasked with watching over Ren Woxing in the underground dungeon in Hangzhou.
 Huangzhonggong is a music fanatic who challenges Linghu Chong to a duel to obtain the score of "Xiaoao Jianghu". After Ren Woxing breaks out of prison, he chooses to commit suicide instead of surrendering to Ren.
 Heibaizi is a weiqi fanatic with a pale face and dark hair. He becomes a handicap after Linghu Chong unknowingly uses the Cosmic Absorbing Power on him, and ends up being killed by Ren Woxing.
 Tubiweng is a calligraphy fanatic who challenges Linghu Chong to a duel but loses. Ren Woxing forces him to surrender and consume a poison pill to prove his loyalty.
 Danqingsheng is an alcoholic drink connoisseur and swordplay expert who befriends Linghu Chong over their common interest in alcoholic drinks. Ren Woxing forces him to surrender in the same manner as Tubiweng.
 Ding Jian, nicknamed "One Lightning Sword", is a servant of the Four Friends who specialises in swordplay.
 Shi Lingwei, nicknamed "Five Paths God", is a servant of the Four Friends who specialises in using the saber.

Guests at Liu Zhengfeng's retirement ceremony
 Old Master Boxer Xia is the leader of the Six Harmonies School in Zhengzhou.
 Tie Laolao is from the Divine Maiden Peak at the Three Gorges.
 Pan Hou is the chief of the Haisha Clan from the eastern sea.
 Bai Ke is nicknamed "Divine Saber".
 Lu Xisi is nicknamed "Divine Brush".
 Official Zhang is an official who recommends Liu Zhengfeng to serve in the government.

Kunlun School

 Zhenshanzi, nicknamed "One Sword of Heaven and Earth", is the leader of the Kunlun School.
 Tan Diren is accidentally killed by Linghu Chong.

Beggars' Gang

 Xie Feng is the chief of the Beggars' Gang.
 Zhang Jin'ao is the deputy chief of the Beggars' Gang who is among the guests at Liu Zhengfeng's retirement ceremony.

Others
 The "Six Immortals of the Peach Valley" are six brothers, each named after a different part of the peach tree. Even though they always quarrel and bicker among themselves, they are united when they take action. They try to cure Linghu Chong of his internal injuries by injecting six streams of inner energy into his body but end up worsening his condition instead. Eventually, they become Linghu Chong's allies and join the (North) Mount Heng School after Linghu becomes its leader.
 Mu Gaofeng is a notorious hunchbacked bandit from the north. He tries to force Lin Pingzhi to be his apprentice and tortures Lin's parents to death when Lin refuses. His hunchback is actually a sack containing poison gas, which when torn, will release the gas and blind everyone around it. Lin Pingzhi eventually tracks him down and kills him to avenge his parents, but becomes blinded in the process after accidentally releasing the poison gas.
 Ping Yizhi is a physician nicknamed "Famous Killer Physician". He believes that life and death are predestined, so saving a life is equivalent to violating the law of nature. As such, he makes a rule that for every life he saves, another must die. He fails to cure Linghu Chong of his internal injuries and commits suicide in shame.
 Lao Touzi and Zu Qianqiu are nicknamed "Lao and Zu of the Yellow River". Zu Qianqiu tricked Linghu Chong into consuming eight medical pills created by Laotouzi to cure his daughter, Laobusi, of a rare illness. After Linghu Chong finds out the truth, he willingly uses his blood, which contains traces of the pills, to save Laobusi, and earns their gratitude in return.
 Ji Wushi, nicknamed "Night Cat" and "To No Avail".
 Zhucaoxian, nicknamed "Cannot Poison Anyone to Death", is the leader of the Hundred Herbs School.
 Baixiong and Heixiong, nicknamed "Twin Bears of the Northern Desert", are a pair of cannibalistic martial artists from northern China.
 Qiu Songnian is a long-haired wandering monk who uses a pair of crescent-shaped blades. He is killed by Yuling.
 Madam Zhang uses a pair of short swords. She is killed by You Xun.
 Xibao is a monk who uses a pair of large cymbals. He is killed by Yan Sanxing.
 Yuling is a Taoist who uses a wolf's teeth club. He is killed by Zhou Gutong and Wu Baiying.
 Yan Sanxing, nicknamed "Twin Serpents Evil Beggar", sports green serpent tattoos on his shoulders. He is killed by Zhou Gutong and Wu Baiying.
 Zhou Gutong and Wu Baiying, nicknamed "Twin Extraordinaries Tong and Bai", are a couple who are each blind in one eye. They use golden walking sticks as their weapons.
 You Xun is killed by Ren Yingying.
 Sima Da is the lord of Long Whale Island.
 Huang Boliu, nicknamed "Silver Bearded Dragon", is the chief of the Heavenly River Gang.
 The "Twin Swords of Diancang" are a pair of swordsmen from the Diancang School. They are killed by Xiang Wentian.
 Songwen is a Taoist from the Emei School. He is scared away by Xiang Wentian.
 Wu Tiande is a military officer from Quanzhou. Linghu Chong steals his uniform and horse and disguises himself as him.
 Qingxiao is the abbess of Water Moon Nunnery in Longquan. She lends her precious sword to the (North) Mount Heng School.
 The "Twin Flying Fish of the Yangtze River" are from the White Dragon Gang in Jiujiang.
 Qinghai Yixiao attacks Tianmen during the special assembly on Mount Song. He dies together with Tianmen.

References

External links
Smiling Proud Wanderer Characters Name in other Languages

Lists of Jin Yong characters
The Smiling, Proud Wanderer